Jane E. Eberle is an American politician from Maine. Eberle was first elected in 2004 as a member of the Maine Democratic Party to represent a portion of Cape Elizabeth and her hometown of South Portland. She earned a bachelor's degree from the University of New Hampshire. She has three children. She was unable to seek re-election in 2012 due to reaching the limit of four consecutive two year terms, and was replaced by fellow Democrat Scott Hamann.

References

Year of birth missing (living people)
Living people
Politicians from South Portland, Maine
Democratic Party members of the Maine House of Representatives
University of New Hampshire alumni
Women state legislators in Maine
21st-century American women